Vyacheslav Frantsevich Kebich (10 June 1936 – 9 December 2020) was a Belarusian politician and the first Prime Minister of Belarus from 1991 to 1994.

Early life
Kebich was born on 10 June 1936, in the village of Konyushevshchina (present-day Minsk region of Belarus). In 1958, he graduated from the engineering department of the Belarusian Polytechnic Institute. He studied at the Higher Party School of the Central Committee of the Communist Party of Belarus. Before his career as a politician, Kebich worked as an engineer.

Prime Minister of Belarus
Kebich was the first Prime Minister of Belarus, serving from 1991 until 1994, having held the equivalent office of the Byelorussian SSR since 1990. During his tenure in office he promoted a pro-Russian stance. In early February 1994 he stated that he would 'continue campaigning for a monetary union with Russia, as I always have done and am doing now. It is not just a question of economic circumstances. We are linked by the closest spiritual bonds; we have a common history and similar cultures.' In early March he told parliament that Belarusian-Russian relations were Minsk's basic foreign policy priority, 'owing to the community of Belarusian-Russian culture, the identical interests of two fraternal peoples.'

Other roles
Kebich was one of the drafters and signees of the Belavezha Accords that effectively ended the Soviet Union and founded the Commonwealth of Independent States. He was also one of two candidates in the final running for President of Belarus in 1994 but lost to current leader Alexander Lukashenko by a wide margin. After the election, he led the Belarusian Commerce and Financial Union and was a member of the House of Representatives.

Death
Kebich died from COVID-19 on 9 December 2020 (the day after the 29th anniversary of the Belavezha Accords), during the COVID-19 pandemic in Belarus.

References

 

1936 births
2020 deaths
People from Valozhyn District
People from Nowogródek Voivodeship (1919–1939)
Belarusian Roman Catholics
Central Committee of the Communist Party of the Soviet Union members
Members of the Congress of People's Deputies of the Soviet Union
Members of the Central Committee of the Communist Party of Byelorussia
Heads of government of the Byelorussian Soviet Socialist Republic
Prime Ministers of Belarus
Members of the House of Representatives of Belarus
Candidates for President of Belarus
Soviet colonels
Belarusian engineers
Soviet engineers
20th-century engineers
Recipients of the Byelorussian SSR State Prize
Recipients of the Order of the Red Banner of Labour
Deaths from the COVID-19 pandemic in Belarus